Ericodesma melanosperma is a species of moth of the family Tortricidae. It is found in New Zealand.

The wingspan is about 21 mm. The forewings are pale grey, with scattered black scales. The costa is suffused with whitish. The hindwings are light grey.

The larvae feed on Dracophyllum longifolium.

References

Moths described in 1916
Archipini
Moths of New Zealand